Eucalyptus striaticalyx, commonly known as Cue York gum or kopi gum, is a species of tree or mallee that is endemic to Western Australia. It has thick, rough, fibrous bark on the trunk and larger branches, lance-shaped adult leaves, flower buds in groups of between seven and thirteen, creamy white flowers and conical to cup-shaped fruit.

Description
It has persistent thick, rough fibrous, dark greyish bark over most of the trunk, smooth and creamy brown to pinkish bark above. Flowering occurs in most months and the flowers are creamy white.

Taxonomy
Eucalyptus striaticalyx was first formally described in 1904 by the botanist William Vincent Fitzgerald in the Journal of the West Australian Natural History Society. The specific epithet is taken from the Latin words striatus meaning "striated" and calyx, in reference  to the operculum.

In 1997, Dean Nicolle described two subspecies of E. striaticalyx and the names have been accepted by the Australian Plant Census:
 Eucalyptus striaticalyx subsp. delicata D.Nicolle, distinguished by its depauperate habit, narrower leaves, smaller flower buds and fruit than the autonym;
 Eucalyptus striaticalyx W.Fitzg. subsp. striaticalyx.

The tree belongs in subgenus Symphyomyrtus section Dumaria to a large sub-group, series Rufispermae, composed of 37 described species and subspecies including E. kondininensis, E. gypsophila and E. repullulans.

Distribution
Cue York gum is found on dunes near salt lakes, low hills and drainage lines and has a scattered distribution throughout the northern Goldfields-Esperance region of Western Australia from near Meekatharra to near Kalgoorlie, where it grows in powdery loam soils. Subspecies delicata has a more restricted distribution around Lake Annean and Lake Austin.

Conservation status
This eucalypt is classified as "not threatened" by the Western Australian Government Department of Parks and Wildlife.

See also
List of Eucalyptus species

References

Eucalypts of Western Australia
Trees of Australia
striaticalyx
Myrtales of Australia
Plants described in 1904
Taxa named by William Vincent Fitzgerald